Agis or AGIS may refer to:

People 
 Agis I (died 900 BC), Spartan king
 Agis II (died 401 BC), Spartan king
 Agis III (died 331 BC), Spartan king
 Agis IV (265–241 BC), Spartan king
 Agis (Paeonian) (died 358 BC), King of the Paeonians
 Agis of Argos, ancient Greek poet
 Maurice Agis (1931–2009), British sculptor and artist

Other uses 
 Agis (play), by John Home
 Agis, several fictional emperors of Isaac Asimov's Galactic Empire
 Apex Global Internet Services
 Atomic gravitational wave interferometric sensor
 Advanced Glaucoma Intervention Study, conducted by the National Eye Institute

See also 
 Agide (disambiguation), modern Italian given name related to Agis

Greek masculine given names